Lepenica is a region in Serbia, roughly between 44° 10' and 44° 15' North, and between 20° 45 and 21° 00' East.

References

Geographical regions of Serbia
Geography of Šumadija and Western Serbia
Šumadija